Samuel Chukwudi Ezeofor (born 8 May 1967) is an Anglican bishop in Nigeria. He is the current Bishop of Aguata, one of nine within the Anglican Province of the Niger, which is, itself, one of 14 provinces within the Church of Nigeria. He was Bishop of Ogbaru until 2018.

Ezeofor was born in Onitsha on 8 May 1967. He was educated at Central School Oko, Aguata High School and the University of Nigeria.

Notes

Living people
Anglican bishops of Aguata
21st-century Anglican bishops in Nigeria
People from Onitsha
University of Nigeria alumni
1967 births
Anglican bishops of Ogbaru